Minibiotus is a genus of tardigrades belonging to the family Macrobiotidae.

The genus has almost cosmopolitan distribution.

Species

Species:

Minibiotus acontistus 
Minibiotus aculeatus 
Minibiotus africanus

References

Parachaela
Tardigrade genera